Ibrahim Ceesay is a Gambian social justice activist, human rights defender, Activist, Peace activist and an award winner of the film Hand of Fate. He is the Executive Director of the African Artists Peace Initiative (AAPI) and also leads and volunteers with various youth organizations on various projects.

Career
Ibrahim Ceesay is the Executive Director of Children and Community Development Initiative for Development (CAID) and Film Director who is a social justice activist, he was named by the Gambia News and Report weekly magazine because of what the management of the magazine said was his highly acclaimed film Hand of Fate.

Awards
He was awarded for the best direct of the movie Hand of Fate and has had several nomination in Africa and the UN as youth ambassador. He was Gambian Personality of the Year in 2013.

References

Gambian film directors
Living people
Year of birth missing (living people)